The Enterprise and Regulatory Reform Act 2013 (c 24), also known as ERRA, is a major Act of the Parliament of the United Kingdom aimed at reforming the regulatory environment faced by small and medium-sized business. It established a UK Green Investment Bank (part 1), reformed several aspects of employment law (part 2), cut regulation (part 5) and addressed a range of other regulatory issues. The Act also strengthened the regulatory settlement on mergers and anti-competitive behaviour (parts 3 and 4). In doing so, part 3 of the Act established a new combined Competition and Markets Authority, which took over the functions of the Office of Fair Trading and the Competition Commission. It received Royal Assent on 25 April 2013. It implemented reforms to UK competition procedures which had been announced in March 2012.

UK Green Investment Bank
Part 1 of the Act dealt with the role and purposes of the UK Green Investment Bank.

Competition provisions 
A major feature of the Act was the merger of the Office of Fair Trading (OFT) and Competition Commission to form a single Competition and Markets Authority (CMA) responsible for both "Phase 1" and "Phase 2" investigations, allowing greater synergy between the two. The ERRA also strengthened the criminal penalties for cartel behaviour by removing the requirement that such behaviour be dishonest: it "will be enough for prosecutors to show that an individual knowingly participated in one of the categories of criminal cartel agreement ... and that relevant information about the arrangements was not to be given to customers, or published, before its implementation". The CMA took on the role of primary enforcer for competition cases, although the Serious Fraud Office can also take action alongside the CMA.

Mergers
The previous merger control regime, which was voluntary in nature, remained in place but the CMA's powers were extended to allow it to require merging businesses to operate independently until its review process had been completed.

Criminal cartels
The requirement for dishonesty in criminal cartel conduct was removed.

See also 
 Competition Act 1998
 Enterprise Act 2002

References

External links 

 

United Kingdom Acts of Parliament 2013
United Kingdom labour law
United Kingdom competition law
Reform in the United Kingdom
Government-owned companies of the United Kingdom